The Black Stallion Returns is a 1983 film adaptation of the book of the same name by Walter Farley, and is a sequel to The Black Stallion. It is the only film directed by Robert Dalva. It was produced by Francis Ford Coppola for MGM/UA Entertainment Company. The film stars Kelly Reno, Vincent Spano and Teri Garr. The portrayal of The Black was shared between Cass Ole, the horse from The Black Stallion, and El Mokhtar.

Plot
Several odd occurrences, including a suspicious fire, happen at the farm where Alec Ramsay (Kelly Reno) and his mother (Teri Garr) stable Alec's horse, the Black. One night, the Black is taken away. Sheik Ishak (Ferdy Mayne) says he is responsible, claiming the stallion is his stolen property that he has retrieved, learning his whereabouts after the Black's win in the Match Race. The Black's real name is Shetan. After learning the sheik is returning the Black to his kingdom in the Moroccan desert, Alec stows away on a plane to Casablanca.

In Morocco, Alec is found on the plane and taken to the American embassy. The police intend to return him to the United States. At the stables, he makes some friends who disguise him as a local Casablancan. They take him to a man named Kurr (Allen Garfield) the leader of a rogue tribe called the Uruk, who is interested in the Black and Sheik Ishak. He allows Alec to travel with him and another man, but they abandon Alec in the desert after the truck breaks down. Alec is picked up by another truck driver. Aboard the truck, he meets Raj (Vincent Spano), who speaks English, and says the Black will probably compete in "The Great Race". The two become friends and travel across the desert on foot with Meslar (Woody Strode), Raj's friend and mentor. Then the Uruk kidnap Meslar, and  Raj and Alec defend themselves against the harsh elements. After running out of water, they collapse but recover when they find a river. Raj's tribe discovers them, welcoming Raj home and Alec to the tribe. Raj takes Alec to the outskirts of Ishak's domain where he is reunited with the Black.

While attempting to retrieve the Black, Alec is apprehended by Ishak's men. He pleads his case to Sheik Ishak, who is sympathetic but will not give up the Black. He is racing the stallion in the "Great Race" with his granddaughter, Tabari (Jodi Thelen) as the rider. Alec insists the Black can only win if he rides him. Denied, Alec coaches Tabari, but the Black throws her off. Then, the Uruk led by Kurr, capture the Black and Alec to a hidden location. Alec escapes with the Black. As they flee, Alec discovers that Meslar is being held prisoner and gives him his pocket knife to cut his bonds. Alec and the Black escape to Ishak's. As a reward for safely returning the Black, Alec is allowed to ride him in the race.

On race day, Alec reunites with Raj, who is also competing. They and the other riders begin their run across the desert. The Uruk's rider tries to kill Alec, but he and the Black escape. Alec discovers that the Uruk's rider pushed Raj off his horse. He returns Raj's mount to him. Together, they race against the Uruk rider until Meslar appears and spooks the rider's horse, unseating him. Suddenly, Kurr chases Raj and Alec in his truck, shooting at them. However, the truck crashes into a ditch.

Alec wins the race, then pleads with Ishak to spare Raj's horse, despite the winning sheik taking any horses he chooses. Ishak grants the reprieve, which allows Alec to repay Raj for his kindness. Meslar returns with Kurr, his accomplice, and the Uruk rider, who are all taken prisoner.

Although Ishak gives the Black to Alec, he decides to leave his horse in Morocco, believing he belongs there.

Cast
 Kelly Reno as Alec Ramsey
 Vincent Spano as Raj 
 Allen Garfield as Kurr 
 Woody Strode as Meslar 
 Ferdy Mayne as Abu Ben Ishak 
 Jodi Thelen as Tabari 
 Teri Garr as Mrs. Ramsey, Alec's Mother
 Hoyt Axton as The Narrator (voice) 
 Cass Ole / El Mokhtar as The Black
 Larbi Doghmi as Arab

Production
The filming locations for "The Black Stallion Returns" took place in Djanet, Algeria; Abiquiu, New Mexico; Italy; Morocco; Santa Clarita & Los Angeles, California; and New York City. The role of the Black Stallion was played by Cass Ole (who starred in the first film) and El Mokhtar, who was used in the racing scenes of the film, but he died from colic during the making of the film.

Reception

Box office
The Black Stallion Returns debuted at #5 at the box office, grossing $2,923,297 during its opening weekend, coming in behind the films High Road to China and Tootsie. The film grossed $12,049,108 at the North American box office.

Critical response
Vincent Canby of The New York Times said the film was "funny, unpretentious and fast-paced. It has a kind of comicbook appreciation for direct action and no time whatsoever for mysticism or for scenery for its own sake, though most of it was shot in Morocco and is fun to look at". The Boston Globe called it a "slow-paced, incompetently directed film with both eyes focused on the box office". Variety magazine said: "The Black Stallion Returns is little more than a contrived, cornball story that most audiences will find to be an interminable bore". Roger Ebert complained about the film's stereotypical portrayal of Arab characters in his review, while noting that Allen Garfield was miscast.

Accolades
Young Artist Awards 
 Best Young Motion Picture Actor in a Feature Film: Kelly Reno (nominated)

See also
 The Black Stallion books

References

External links
 
  
 
 
 
 
 

1983 films
1980s adventure films
American sequel films
American Zoetrope films
Films about horses
Films based on American novels
Films shot in Algeria
Films scored by Georges Delerue
Films set in Morocco
Films set in the 20th century
Films set in 1947
Metro-Goldwyn-Mayer films
United Artists films
1983 directorial debut films
1980s English-language films